The Texas Superior Service Medal is the fourth highest military decoration that can be conferred to a service member of the Texas Military Forces. It can also be conferred to civilians. No devices are authorized for this decoration.

Eligibility
The Texas Superior Service Medal may be conferred to: (A) a service member of the Texas Military Forces who has: (i) completed 30 or more years of honorable service or a combination of Texas and United States Armed Forces service; and (ii) continually demonstrated superior performance and service while assigned to key leadership positions demanding responsibility; or (B) a civilian who has contributed significant service to the Texas Military Forces.

Authority
The Texas Superior Service Medal was established by Representative Dan Flynn in House Bill Number 2896, authorized by the Eightieth Texas Legislature, and approved by Governor Rick Perry on 15 June 2007, effective the same date.

Description 
The medal pendant is of gold finished bronze, 2 inch in diameter. On the obverse side is a five-pointed raised star, 1-1/4 inch raised. In the raised center of the star is the inscription “TEXAS MILITARY FORCES” on a banner with raised letters. On the upper left in raised letters the word “SUPERIOR” and on the upper right in raised letters the word “SERVICE” is written. The reverse of the medal pendant is inscribed with the date and name of the recipient. The pendant is suspended by a ring from a silk moiré ribbon, 1-3/8 inch wide, composed of hunter green with 2 azure blue pin stripes and three white stars centered in the ribbon. The three stars identify the branches of the Texas Military Forces.

Recipients

See also 

 Awards and decorations of the Texas Military
 Awards and decorations of the Texas government

 Texas Military Forces
 Texas Military Department
 List of conflicts involving the Texas Military

External links
Texas Superior Service Medal

References

Texas
Long service medals
Awards established in 2007
2007 establishments in Texas